The Omani French Museum is a heritage museum located in the former residence of the French Consul, Bait Faransa on Lane 9310, Qasr Al Alam Street, in Old Muscat, Oman.

The white building, which was essentially a palace, was initially established as a present by the Sultan Assayed / Faisal bin Turki to the French Consul in Muscat in 1896. On January 29, 1992, Sultan Qaboos bin Said and the late French President François Mitterrand established a museum in the palace to preserve the historical Omani-French relations. The museum has a substantial collection of items to this effect including photographs of the early French diplomats, historical documents, Omani - French ships, Omani and French costumes and jewellery and furniture.

See also
 List of museums in Oman

References

1992 establishments in Oman
Museums established in 1992
History museums in Oman
Museums in Muscat, Oman
Cultural history of France
Old Muscat